Deivi Cruz Garcia (born November 6, 1972) is a Dominican former professional baseball shortstop.

Cruz played at the Major League Baseball level for nine seasons (-) with the Detroit Tigers, San Diego Padres, Baltimore Orioles, San Francisco Giants, and Washington Nationals. In 1,234 career games, Cruz had a .269 batting average with 70 home runs and 464 runs batted in.

In 1997, Cruz was honored as Tigers Rookie of the Year.

Cruz was released by the St. Louis Cardinals on March 30, 2006, and signed with the Bridgeport Bluefish on June 10, 2006.

Cruz' nephew, Yeyson Yrizarri, is also a professional baseball shortstop.

References

External links

1972 births
Living people
Arizona League Giants players
Baltimore Orioles players
Baseball players at the 2007 Pan American Games
Bellingham Giants players
Bridgeport Bluefish players
Burlington Bees players
Detroit Tigers players
Dominican Republic expatriate baseball players in the United States
Erie SeaWolves players
Fresno Grizzlies players
Lakeland Tigers players

Major League Baseball players from the Dominican Republic
Major League Baseball shortstops
San Diego Padres players
San Francisco Giants players
Toledo Mud Hens players
Washington Nationals players
Pan American Games competitors for the Dominican Republic
People from Nizao